The Pegasus Stakes is a Listed American  Thoroughbred horse race run annually in June at Monmouth Park Racetrack in Oceanport, New Jersey. An event for three-year-olds of either gender, it is contested at a mile and an sixteenth (eight and a half furlongs) on the dirt, and currently offers a purse of $150,000. 

Inaugurated as a minor event on November 11, 1980 at Meadowlands Racetrack in East Rutherford, New Jersey, the following year it became the Pegasus Handicap and would be run as such thru 2002. There was no race in 2003 and it returned in 2004 as the Pegasus Stakes. The race was hosted by Meadowlands 1980–2006 and 2008–2009. Its 1996 edition was raced on the turf course. 

A former Grade 1 race, the 1997 Pegasus offered a purse of $1,000,000.

Historical race notes
Ridden by Jorge Chavez, in 1999 Forty One Carats won the Pegasus Handicap by a nose over Unbridled Jet. The winner's time of 1:45 2/5 broke the Meadowlands track record for a mile and one-eighth on dirt.

Sally Bailie became the first woman trainer in the history of American Thoroughbred racing to win a $200,000 race when she captured the 1982 edition of the Pegasus Handicap with Fast Gold.

Records
Speed  record:
 1:45.40 @  miles:  Forty One Carats (1999) (NTR)

 1:40.80 @  miles Flying Chevron  (1995)

Most wins by a jockey:
 5 – Joe Bravo (1998, 2016, 2018, 2019, 2020)

Most wins by a trainer:
 4 – Todd Pletcher (2005, 2008, 2013, 2016, 2019)

Most wins by an owner:
 2 – William H. Perry (1991, 1992)

Winners

References

Horse races in New Jersey
Flat horse races for three-year-olds
Previously graded stakes races in the United States
Recurring sporting events established in 1980
Monmouth Park Racetrack
Meadowlands Racetrack